Secret Double Octopus (SDO) is an Israeli software company specializing in passwordless authentication for enterprise environments.

History
The company was founded in 2015 by a team of entrepreneurs and security researchers from Ben-Gurion University of the Negev in Beersheba. The team was led by Prof. Shlomi Dolev and Dr. Shimrit Tzur-David.

The company's core product is based on proprietary password alternatives for password-based legacy systems and secure communications using secret sharing algorithms, originally developed to protect nuclear launch codes, now used to prevent cyber attacks. Secret Double Octopus' technology is regarded as a universal replacement for passwords, OTPs, physical security keys, smart cards, and other authentication mechanisms.

The company uses proprietary phone-as-a-token technology to prevent unauthorized use of systems while preventing identity theft.

Secret Double Octopus has offices in Europe and the U.S. Its headquarters are in Tel-Aviv and Palo Alto, California.

Product and funding
The company offers an enterprise authentication platform that covers on-premises assets, cloud applications, remote tools (e.g. VPNs and RDPs), desktop/laptop workstation authentication and an authenticator app for passwordless authentication or multi-factor authentication.
 
The company raised a $6 million A round from JVP, Iris Capital, Liberty Israel and Benhamou Global Ventures.

In April 2020, the company announced a $15 million Series B round to expand their passwordless authentication and remote-access security solutions for enterprises. The new round brings the company's total funding to $22.5 million.

Awards and recognition
Double Octopus was named a Gartner 'Cool Vendor' in 2016 and in 2017, Business Insider listed it on its "50 startups that will boom according to VCs".

In 2021 the company was named "Best in Class" for enterprise passwordless authentication by the Aite Group

See also
Economy of Israel
Start-up Nation

References 

Information technology companies
Software companies of Israel
Security companies of Israel
Software companies established in 2015